Brightspeed of Eastern Kansas, Inc. is one of several Brightspeed companies providing local telephone service in Kansas. Kansas towns that Brightspeed of Eastern Kansas serves include Sterling, Lebo, Gardner, and Nortonville.

The current company was founded in 1927 and became United Telephone Company of Iowa. In 1988, the company acquired exchanges in Kansas, exited Iowa, and changed its name to United Telephone Company of Eastern Kansas.

Sale
On August 3, 2021, Lumen announced its sale of its local telephone assets in 20 states to Apollo Global Management, including Kansas. 

The sale to Apollo closed on October 3, 2022.

References

See also
Brightspeed
CenturyLink
Sprint Nextel

Lumen Technologies
Sprint Corporation
Telecommunications companies of the United States
Telecommunications companies established in 1988
Communications in Kansas
American companies established in 1927